Romilly Bernard Craze (1892-1974) was an English architect.

Life

He was the son of George Henry Craze and his wife Louisa Mary Webb. He was born in 1892, and baptised on 17 February 1900 in St Luke's Church, West Norwood.

He married Elizabeth Ethel Dutton on 6 September 1919.

Craze worked in partnership with Sir William Victor Mordaunt Milner, with whom he formed the firm of Milner & Craze. He spent much of his career repairing churches damaged by bombing during the Second World War, but also produced some distinctive churches of his own.

Works

Christ Church, St Leonards-on-Sea, internal improvements, 1933.
 Offices, workshops and a garage for the Stepney Carrier Co. at 94–100 St John Street, London, 1935. Demolished. 
Shrine of Our Lady of Walsingham, Norfolk, 1937.
 St. Martin's Church, Hull, 1939.
St Paul’s Church, Arbourthorne, Sheffield 1939.
St Thomas's Church, Oakwood, 1939.
St Luke’s Church, Camberwell, 1954.
All Saints’ Church, Kingsbury, 1954.
St Mary Abbots, Kensington, new ceiling, 1955. 
St Aidan’s Church, Hull, 1955.
St. Mary's Church, Southampton, 1956.
St George's Cathedral, Southwark Rebuilding, 1953 - 1958.
St Cuthbert’s Church, Wembley, 1959.
St Richard’s Church, Maybridge, Goring-by-Sea, 1966.
St Thomas’ Church, Kensal Town, 1967.
SS Peter & Paul, Enfield Lock, 1969.
Church of the Ascension, Stirchley, Birmingham, 1973.

References

1892 births
1974 deaths
Architects from London